HMS Redwing (pennant number T36) was a torpedo recovery vessel built for the Royal Navy. She was built by J. Samuel White & Company, East Cowes, Isle of Wight and was launched on 29 October 1933. She was builder's number 1753. She was the sister ship of HMS Elfin, yard nr 1754.  She was a tender to the torpedo school HMS Defiance in Devonport.

Notes 

1933 ships
Submarine tenders
Ships built on the Isle of Wight
Ships and vessels on the National Archive of Historic Vessels